RTL Crime is a Dutch pay television channel dedicated to television crime and reality series. It first launched on 27 November 2006 in Germany and on 1 September 2011 in the Netherlands. It is owned by RTL Group. It replaced MisdaadNet that was owned by Endemol. RTL Crime features a Dutch/English audio track with Dutch subtitles.

An HD-simulcast started through Ziggo on 30 November 2017.

Programming

Domestic
Moordvrouw (repeats)

Imported
Ashes to Ashes
Bones
Castle
Criminal Minds
CSI: Crime Scene Investigation
CSI: Miami
CSI: NY
Fast Forward
Forensic Files
The Good Guys
Homicide Hunter
Inspector Rex
Shark
Single-Handed
Taxi
Unhappily Ever After
Women Behind Bars

References

External links
Official website

RTL Group
RTL Nederland
Television channels in the Netherlands
Television channels and stations established in 2011